"The Rest of My Life" is a song recorded by American musician Prince. It was released as the first promotional single from his twenty-second studio album The Vault: Old Friends 4 Sale (1999). It was issued in 1999 as a CD single, exclusively in Japan. Prince solely wrote and produced it, while a series of individuals provided various instrumentation for the track.

Originally recorded in April 1992, the song remained unreleased for seven years until the announcement of The Vault: Old Friends 4 Sale. The Japanese CD single was released by Warner Bros. Records and included the album version of the single, plus the lead single from the album, "Extraordinary".

Background and release 
In July 1999, Prince announced the upcoming release of The Vault: Old Friends 4 Sale, a collection of previously unreleased material from his partnership with Warner Bros. Records. The material created was recorded throughout 1985 and 1994, and was promoted by the release of one single, "Extraordinary", on August 10, 1999. "The Rest of My Life" was written during recording sessions for the Love Symbol Album (1992). A CD single of "The Rest of My Life" was released exclusively in Japan, to further promote The Vault: Old Friends 4 Sale. The CD solely included the album version of the track and lead single "Extraordinary", but was not made available for purchase as it was a promotional CD.

Track listing

Credits and personnel 
Credits adapted from The Vault: Old Friends 4 Sale liner notes

 Prince – vocals, lyrics, production, instruments
 Michael B. – drums
 Tommy Barbarella – keyboards
 Brian Gallagher – tenor saxophone
 Mr. Hayes – keyboards
 Kathy J. – baritone saxophone

 Dave Jensen – trumpet
 Michael Nelson – trombone
 Levi Seacer, Jr. – guitar
 Steve Strand – trumpet
 Sonny T. – bass guitar

References 

1999 songs
Prince (musician) songs
Song recordings produced by Prince (musician)
Songs written by Prince (musician)